The Mil Milhas Brasil (also known as the Mil Milhas Brasileiras or 1000 Miles of Brazil in Portuguese) is a sports car endurance race held annually in Brazil since 1956.

The Mil Milhas has been held nearly every year since its inception and is one of the longest running motor racing events in Brazil. Nearly every running has used the Interlagos circuit, but the 1997 and 1999 events were held at Brasília and Curitiba respectively.

Zeca Giaffone holds the record of most wins, having won in 1981, 1984, 1986, 1988 and 1989.

History
The first Mil Milhas was organized by Eloy Gagliano and Wilson Fittipaldi Sr., the father of Wilson Fittipaldi Júnior and Emerson Fittipaldi. The two had been inspired by the 1949 Italian Mille Miglia. Wilson Fittipaldi Sr. was a journalist and brought media as well as sponsors such as auto parts companies to support the event. The first event was held on November 24–25, 1956 with 31 sports cars competing at the Interlagos circuit.

The race has been held at Interlagos from 1956 to 1996. In 1997, the Brasília circuit held the event. In 1998, Interlagos again held the event. In 1999, the Curitiba circuit held the event. Since 2001, the event has been held at Interlagos.

In 2007, the race was held as a part of the Le Mans Series, the first time the race had been part of an international championship. The event had previously been supported as a non-championship event in the BPR Global GT Series as well as the FIA GT Championship. FIA GT planned to add the event to their calendar in 2007, but chose to hand the event instead to Le Mans Series organizers.

Results

Winners on 8 km Interlagos track (1956–1989)

Winners on 4.3 km Interlagos track (1990–1996)

Winners 1997–2000

Winners on Interlagos track (2001–2008)

2009–2019

The race was not held in the decade 2009–2019

Winners since 2020

References

External links

 
Sports car races
Auto races in Brazil
Endurance motor racing
European Le Mans Series races